Herlev Hospital (former ) is a hospital in Herlev, Denmark, close to Copenhagen. It is famous for being Denmark's tallest building. Its modern, functional architecture in bright concrete, glass and bronze-colored aluminum gives a unique impression.

The building was designed by Gehrdt Bornebusch in collaboration with Max Brüel and Jørgen Selchau. Sven Hansen was the landscape architect while the artistic decoration was done by Poul Gernes.

Its construction began in 1965 and the hospital was finished in 1975. It was opened in 1976. The hospital has 1,616 beds (of 2010) and employs about 4,000 people and tends to 82,000 patients annually.

The hospital is a teaching hospital for medical students from Copenhagen University.

The former title Amtssygehuset i Herlev was changed when the Danish Municipal Reform of January 1, 2007 abolished the amter and replaced them with five administrative regions.

In 1987 the hospital was involved in the case of the hospital bombings where an undetonated pipe bomb was found in the hospital.

Additional images

References

External links

Official website

Hospital buildings completed in 1975
Hospitals in Copenhagen
Hospitals in Denmark
Medical education in Denmark
Teaching hospitals
Buildings and structures in Herlev Municipality
Hospitals established in 1976
1976 establishments in Denmark
Skyscrapers in Denmark